Drengman Olsen Aaker (September 24, 1839 – March 30, 1894) was an American politician and businessman.

Biography
Born in Hjartdal, Telemark in Norway, Aaker emigrated with his parents to the United States in 1848 and settled in Waukesha County, Wisconsin. In 1854, Aaker and his family settled in Winneshiek County, Iowa. During the American Civil War, Aaker served in the 12th Iowa Volunteer Infantry Regiment.

Aaker later lived in Ridgeway, Iowa and was in the mercantile business.  In the years following his marriage in 1869 to Christina Andersdatter Turvold (1849–1922), Aaker grew to become a successful business figure in Winneshiek County, being the operator of a lumber yard. Later he was member of the mercantile firm of Galby and Aaker, dealing in grain throughout the 1870s. In the latter part of that decade Aaker sold his lumber yard and became the owner of the Ridgeway Creamery, which later burned to the ground in March 1884.

From 1882 to 1886, Aaker served in the Iowa House of Representatives and was a Republican. Aaker died at his home in Ridgeway, Iowa at age 54.

References

External links

1839 births
1894 deaths
People from Hjartdal
Norwegian emigrants to the United States
People from Winneshiek County, Iowa
People of Iowa in the American Civil War
Union Army soldiers
Businesspeople from Iowa
Republican Party members of the Iowa House of Representatives
19th-century American politicians
19th-century American businesspeople